The Jamsu Bridge crosses the Han River in South Korea and connects the districts of Yongsan-gu and Seocho-gu. The bridge was completed in 1976, and lies just meters above the waterline, allowing the bridge to submerge during periods of high rainfall. In 1982, Banpo Bridge was built on top of the Jamsu Bridge, creating a two-deck bridge.

References

Bridges in Seoul
Bridges completed in 1976
1976 establishments in South Korea
20th-century architecture in South Korea

ko:반포대교#잠수교